Vikantice is a municipality and village in Šumperk District in the Olomouc Region of the Czech Republic. It has about 80 inhabitants.

History
The first written mention of Vikantice is from 1437.

During World War II, the German occupiers operated a forced labour subcamp of the Stalag VIII-B/344 prisoner-of-war camp at a local paper mill. 120 Allied POWs were imprisoned there.

References

External links

Villages in Šumperk District